Stuart Alan Brock (born 26 September 1976) is an English footballer who made 135 appearances in the Football League playing as a goalkeeper for Kidderminster Harriers. His last known club was Hednesford Town, from which he departed in 2010.

Career
A former Aston Villa trainee, Brock spent three years as a professional at Villa Park, but never made a first team appearance. He joined Northampton Town in March 1997, but once again failed to make the first team. At the end of the 1996–1997 season, he was released, where he joined Football Conference side Kidderminster Harriers.

He became Harriers number one soon after, going on to play over 150 times for the Aggborough club. He won the Conference title with Harriers in 2000-2001 – despite having to battle for the number one jersey with the vastly experienced Tim Clarke – and made twenty six appearances as they romped to the title.

After falling down the pecking order during the 2003–2004 season, Brock left Kidderminster in the summer of 2004, joining Halesowen Town. His stay was brief – a week – before he became one of AFC Telford United's first ever signings in July 2004. In his three years at the New Bucks Head, he played over 100 times, making him the reformed club's highest appearance maker, and won two promotions.

Sandwiched in between were two more goes at professional football; firstly, in October 2004, Peter Taylor's Hull City came calling, with Brock spending a month on loan at the KC Stadium as cover for regular keeper (and another ex-Villa trainee) Boaz Myhill. He also trialled for League Two side Oxford United in early 2005, playing in a reserve game for the Kassam Stadium side.

After clinching promotion to Conference North via the Northern Premier League play-offs in 2006–2007, Telford brought in Hednesford's Ryan Young, immediately relegating Brock to the stands. He was allowed to leave in November 2007, joining Southern League Premier Division strugglers Bromsgrove Rovers for a short spell, before dropping down a further level to link up with Dean Edwards at Willenhall Town, where he saw out the 2007–2008 season.

Notes
A. : Kidderminster appearances from 1999–2000 season onwards only.

References

External links

1976 births
Living people
Sportspeople from West Bromwich
English footballers
Association football goalkeepers
Aston Villa F.C. players
Northampton Town F.C. players
Solihull Borough F.C. players
Kidderminster Harriers F.C. players
Halesowen Town F.C. players
AFC Telford United players
Hull City A.F.C. players
Bromsgrove Rovers F.C. players
Willenhall Town F.C. players
Hednesford Town F.C. players
Stourbridge F.C. players
English Football League players
National League (English football) players